"Stereosaurus" (meaning "solid lizard") is the name given to an as-yet undescribed genus of plesiosaur. Among the species are: "Stereosaurus platyomus", "S. cratynotus" and "S. stenomus", all coined by British paleontologist Harry Seeley, who considered them to be plesiosaurian, in 1869. None have ever been formally described, and since so much time has passed, the original remains may have been lost or renamed something else by now.

See also
 List of plesiosaur genera
 Timeline of plesiosaur research

References

H. G. Seeley. 1892. The Nature of the Shoulder Girdle and Clavicular Arch in Sauropterygia. Proceedings of the Royal Society of London 51:119-151

External links

 "Stereosaurus" in the Paleobiology Database

Nomina nuda
Cretaceous plesiosaurs of Europe